Hamidiyeh is a city in Khuzestan Province, Iran.

Hamidiyeh may also refer to:
 Hamidiyeh, East Azerbaijan
 Hamidiyeh, Isfahan
 Hamidiyeh, Kerman
 Hamidiyeh, Zarand, Kerman Province
 Hamidiyeh, Dasht-e Azadegan, Khuzestan Province
 Hamidiyeh, Hoveyzeh, Khuzestan Province
 Hamidiyeh, Markazi
 Hamidiyeh, Mehdishahr, Semnan Province
 Hamidiyeh District, in Khuzestan Province

See also
 Hamidiyah
 Hamidiye (disambiguation)